Teknecik  is a  very small mountain village in Aydıncık district of Mersin Province, Turkey. The village is situated in the Taurus Mountains. The population of the Teknecik is only 18 as of 2012.

References

Villages in Aydıncık District (Mersin)